Benoit Denizet-Lewis is a writer with The New York Times Magazine, a New York Times best-selling author, and a tenured professor of writing, literature and publishing at Emerson College.

Background 
A citizen of both France and the United States, Denizet-Lewis was born and raised in San Francisco, California. He graduated from the French American International High School, at which he co-founded the school newspaper, The Exposer, played varsity basketball, and wrote plays that were produced by the school. Four years later, he obtained a bachelor's degree in journalism from Medill at Northwestern University, where he was a columnist and sports editor for the Daily Northwestern and joined the Phi Delta Theta fraternity. 
His father is Dennis Lewis.

Professional 
A former editor-in-chief at The Good Men Project and features editor at XY, Denizet-Lewis began writing for the Times Magazine when he was 26. Since then, he has penned cover stories and features about sex, gender, identity, politics, youth culture, mental health, sports, addiction, music, and dogs. His 2017 cover story about anxious young people was the magazine's most read story of the year. Denizet-Lewis also appears regularly on television and radio programs, including the Today Show, Good Morning America, Anderson Cooper 360, and NPR's On Point and Here and Now. His latest book (titled Travels With Casey) was published July 22, 2014, and is a New York Times bestseller. The book tells the story of the author's nearly four-month journey in an RV with his dog. Denizet-Lewis also wrote two other books published by Simon & Schuster. The first, America Anonymous: Eight Addicts in Search of a Life, is an account of three years in the lives of eight addicts—and a larger exploration of our culture of addiction. The second, American Voyeur: Dispatches From the Far Reaches of Modern Life, is a collection of Denizet-Lewis's previously published writing.

Denizet-Lewis's work has also appeared in RollingStone, Sports Illustrated, Details, The New Republic,  Boston Magazine, Spin, Salon.com, Jane, ESPN the Magazine, Radar, the San Francisco Chronicle, and Slate.com.

Denizet-Lewis's non-fiction often takes the form of in-depth profiles or exposes, marked by embedded research. His work examines and explicates manifold aspects of what might loosely be called American culture, with a focus on subcultures or groups that are reviled, disliked, or erased. In a review of his work, Publishers Weekly wrote that Denizet-Lewis "offers stirring and sensitive portraits of individuals—frequently adolescents—struggling to articulate desire and identity while bearing the weight of societal taboo and marginalization." Denizet-Lewis is also known for spotlighting trends, such as rising rates of anxiety among young people and the increased prevalence of middle-schoolers coming out as gay or bisexual. He has also written lengthy features about, among other things, addiction, homeless LGBT youth, teen Christians, ex-gays, NAMBLA, Abercrombie & Fitch, LGBT conservatives, and the culture of sports. Denizet-Lewis is also often called upon to profile celebrities, including James Franco, Jake Gyllenhaal, Barry Bonds, Brad Gilbert, Perez Hilton, Barney Frank, and Dr. Drew.

Denizet-Lewis was named one of the "50 Most Influential LGBT People in Media" by The Advocate and serves as a commentator on TV, radio, and in other public fora.

Accolades 
Denizet-Lewis received an Alicia Patterson Foundation grant in 2004. He has twice been a finalist for the Livingston Award for journalists under 35. He has received the Excellence in Journalism Award from the National Lesbian and Gay Journalists Association, the Maggie Award for magazine writing, and the Peninsula Press Club Award for sports writing and the GLAAD award for magazine writing. In 2010, Denizet-Lewis was the recipient of a GLAAD Media Award for "Outstanding Magazine Article" ("Coming Out in Middle School", The New York Times Magazine).

Denizet-Lewis is included on a list of openly gay media professionals in The Advocate's "Forty under 40" issue of June/July 2009.

Notes

External links 
 

1975 births
Living people
American investigative journalists
American LGBT journalists
American LGBT writers
Medill School of Journalism alumni
Writers from San Francisco
21st-century LGBT people